Anamangad is a village in Malappuram district in the state of Kerala, India.

Demographics
 India census, Anamangad had a population of 14,236 with 6,906 males and 7,330 females.

Landmarks 
A special centre which is an out campus of Aligarh Muslim University is located here.

Transportation
Anamangad village connects to other parts of India through Perinthalmanna town. State Highway 53 passes through Anamangad which connects Cherpulassery and Perinthalmanna. National Highway 66 passes through Tirur and the northern stretch connects to Goa and Mumbai. The southern stretch connects to Cochin and Trivandrum. National Highway 966 passing through Perinthalmanna connects Kozhikode and Palakkad. The nearest airport is at Karipur which is 50 km from Anamangad.

References

Villages in Malappuram district
Perinthalmanna area